The United Arab Emirates competed at the 2010 Summer Youth Olympics, the inaugural Youth Olympic Games, held in Singapore from 14 August to 26 August 2010.

Equestrian

Sailing

One Person Dinghy

Shooting

Rifle

Taekwondo

References

External links
Competitors List: United Arab Emirates – Singapore 2010 official site

2010 in Emirati sport
Nations at the 2010 Summer Youth Olympics
United Arab Emirates at the Youth Olympics